Nematostella is a genus of sea anemones in the family Edwardsiidae. Of the three species in the genus, the best known is the starlet sea anemone (N. vectensis), which has been extensively studied as a model organism in fields such as genetics, evolution, and ecology. The defining morphological apomorphy of Nematostella is the presence of nematosomes.

Species:
 Nematostella nathorstii (Carlgren, 1921)
 Nematostella polaris (Carlgren, 1921)
 Nematostella vectensis Stephenson, 1935 – starlet sea anemone

References

Edwardsiidae
Hexacorallia genera